The Tyin Power Station  (Tyin kraftverk) is a hydroelectric power station located at Årdal in Vestland, Norway.

See also

References 

Årdal
Buildings and structures in Vestland
Dams in Norway
Hydroelectric power stations in Norway